Patrick Autréaux (born March 14, 1968) is a French writer who has held appointments as a writer-in-residence at Boston University (2018–2019) and a visiting scholar at the Massachusetts Institute of Technology (2018). After training in medicine and anthropology, he practiced as an emergency-room psychiatrist in Paris and started writing poetry and contemporary art reviews before publishing fiction.

An early experience with cancer led him to write three books on the topic of illness: Dans la vallée des larmes, Soigner et Se survivre.  Dans la vallée des larmes relates the experience of a thirty-five year old doctor coming to terms with a lymphoma whose diagnosis had been suddenly announced. Soigner is about a patient in remission who resumes his previous role of doctor and cares for his dying grandfather. Se survivre consists of seven meditations on the state of illness.

Since these early writings, his work has developed in new directions: a hidden family drama that unravels during the expulsion of an undocumented person in France (Les Irréguliers), the agitation of a tree shaken by a storm as a metaphor for the loss of a loved one (Le grand vivant) and a narrative retracing Autréaux’s personal journey between medicine and literature (La Voix écrite). 
Les Irréguliers was born out of the experience the author had when seeking news of a detained undocumented friend. Le grand vivant labels itself a “standing poem” which brings to life the dying moments of a beloved grandfather, who until his last breath, had sheltered the presence of his deceased wife and was in the eyes of his grandson, a protective figure.”  Le grand vivant was performed in 2015 the French Avignon theater festival.  Lastly, La Voix écrite  is an autobiographical tale on the long road to writing.  This tale speak particularly of the relationship between the author and his former editor “Max” behind whom we decipher “the protective figure of J.-B. Pontalis”, psychoanalyst and editor at Gallimard.

In 2016, Autréaux published with the Diderot Institute a polemical take on the terrorist attack, “Je suis Charlie, un an après”, written for a round table at Harvard University and Boston University.

His first novel In the Valley of Tears has been translated into English by Eduardo Febles and published in 2019 at Unconscious in Translation Books.

He was nominated for the Prix Décembre and Prix Femina for his novel Quand la parole attend la nuit (Verdier, 2019).

List of Works

Works of fiction 
 Dans la vallée des larmes (récit) Gallimard, 2009.
In the Valley of Tears, UIT Books, NY, 2019.
 Soigner, Gallimard, 2010.
 Le Dedans des choses, Gallimard, 2012 (prix Amic (fr)).
 Se survivre, Éditions Verdier (fr), 2013.
 Les Irréguliers (roman), Gallimard, 2015.
 Le Grand vivant (théâtre), Éditions Verdier (fr), 2016.
 La Voix écrite, Éditions Verdier (fr), 2017.
 Dans la vallée des larmes et Soigner (réunis), Gallimard, Folio, 2017.
Quand la parole attend la nuit (roman), Éditions Verdier (fr), 2019 (finalist for Prix Décembre and Prix Femina)
Pussyboy, Éditions Verdier (fr), 2021
L'instant du toujours,Éditions du Chemin de fer, 2022
La Sainte de la famille, Éditions Verdier, 2023

Essays and articles 
 Portrait d’un poète vietnamien : Hoàng Câm, Carnets du Vietnam, 2006
 Thérèse de Lisieux, La confiance et l'abandon, présentation et choix de textes, Éditions du Seuil, 2008
 Nuit verte, Libres Cahiers pour la psychanalyse (fr), L’amour de transfert, 2011
 Se survivre, La Nouvelle Revue Française, Moi & Je, 2011
 L’Enfant de Goya, Libres Cahiers pour la psychanalyse (fr), Partir, revenir, 2012
 Signe vivant, Décapage (revue) (fr), 2013
 Cybercondrie, Libres Cahiers pour la psychanalyse (fr), Une inquiétude mortelle, l’hypochondrie, 2013
 Et moi je vous en pose des questions? Décapage (revue) (fr), 2015
 Je suis Charlie-Un an après, note de l’Institut Diderot (Paris), 2016
 Les Perches du Nil, de l’écosystème éditorial, Décapage (revue) (fr), 2016
 Une fantaisie, in Jean Genet, l’échappée belle, Musée des Civilisations de l'Europe et de la Méditerranée|MuCEM Gallimard, 2016
 L'été Nabokov, Études (revue) (fr), avril 2018
 Vous aviez mon cœur, in Penser le soin avec Simone Weil, PUF, 2018
 Petite d'homme, in Revue française de psychanalyse, L'Impatience,  2, Vol 82, 2018
 La Sainte Boue, in Cahiers Claude Simon, 2018
Les Saintes Huiles de Jean Genet, La Nouvelle Revue Française, n°633, novembre 2018
Kateb Yacine, la révolution dans la révolution, Les Lettres françaises (fr), n°169, mars 2019
De l’autre côté : à propos de Bao Ninh, Les Lettres françaises (fr), n°171, juin 2019
Vassal du Soleil, in catalogue Jean Giono, MuCEM Gallimard, 2019
Dans un mois, dans un an, revue Par ici la sortie, n°2, Éditions du Seuil, 2020
Le Triton à la perle, Éditions Pou, 2020
Et j'écris dans ce désordre, in Europe (revue) (fr) (Jean Genet), 2021
Les Saintes Huiles de Jean Genet, in revue Mettray, 2021
Denis dit D. Belloc, in Zone critique, 2021
Constat, à propos de Ferdinando Camon,in Europe (revue), 2023

Writings on art 
 madé ou l’Art de la synecdoque (galerie Intérieure, Lille), 2005
 L’Ithaque d’André Le Bozec (Musée Matisse du Cateau-Cambrésis), 2005
 Un homme heureux. Portrait d’un collectionneur, in catalogue de la donation Le Bozec (Musée de Cambrai), 2007
 Parole à voir : dialogues en noir blanc gris (Musée des Ursulines, Mâcon), 20O9
 Sous-bois, huiles de L. B. Spadavecchia (Faisanderie de Sénart, Étiolles), 2010
Alix Le Méléder (galerie Bernard Zürcher, Paris), 2010
Vrai corps, œuvres sur papier de Bertrand Lagadec, (Atelier blanc, Champlay), 2010
 Guy de Lussigny ou L’Art des arlequinades décomposées (catalog on Lussigny, Musée de Cambrai), 2010
 Les deux éternités, ardoises de Nicolas Kennett, in "Escaut : rives, dérives" (Somogy Éditions d'art), 2011
 … du printemps de Thierry Thieû Niang, Éditions du Musée d'Art contemporain du Val-de-Marne|Mac/Val, 2013
 Texte et entretien in Alix Le Méléder - Traces, peintures, Éditions Tituli, 2016
Still life selon TM, préface à Qu'en moi Tokyo s'anonyme de Thibault Marthouret, Éditions Abordo, 2018
Eve Gramatzki, l’extase empêchée, in Eve Gramatzki, une histoire critique, 1972-2022, Éditions Méridianes, 2022

Interviews 
 Diacritik (with Johan Faerber), March 4, 2021
A reading and conversation (with Odile Cazenave), WBUR, July 5, 2020
Politis (with Christophe Kantcheff), Octobre 1 2019
Diacritik (with Johan Faerber), September 16, 2019
Strangeness from within (with Odile Cazenave), WBUR, June 10, 2018
J'ai déjà connu le bonheur (with Jean-Christophe Rufin), April 1, 2018
L'Heure Bleue (with Ruwen Ogien and Laure Adler), March 17, 2017
Poésie et ainsi de suite (with Manou Farine), January 13, 2017
Politis (with Christophe Kantcheff), February 17, 2016
Hors Champs (with Laure Adler), Septembre 29 2015
Un autre jour est possible (with Tewfik Hakem), April 4, 2013
Du jour au lendemain (with Alain Veinstein), April 7, 2012
Pas la peine de crier (with Marie Richeux), February 27, 2012
Décision santé (with Gilles Noussenbaum), September 2009

Awards and distinctions 
 Laureate of the Villa Marguerite-Yourcenar 2011
 Amic Prize Winner, Prix de l'Académie française 2012
 Laureate of the Paris-Québec Fellowship 2012
 Writing Residency Winner, Fondation des Treilles 2015
 Prix Coupleux-Lassalle 2016
 Bourse de traduction Hemingway Grants (Institut français de New York) 2018
 Writer-in-residence at Boston University (Boston, USA) 2018-2019
 Dora Maar House fellow (Brown Foundation) 2022

References 

21st-century French novelists
21st-century French male writers
French male novelists
Living people
1968 births
French LGBT novelists
People from Melun